Richmond International High School and College (RIHSC) was a private school in Richmond, British Columbia, founded in 1991. It was Japanese-owned, and catered primarily to foreign students. Canadian students attending majored in education. Fewer than 10 were accepted into the major per year. The school closed in 2005; a sister school in Tokyo remains in operation.

Academic programs 
The high school offered grades 10 to 12 under the B.C. curriculum. 

The college offered:
 English language training
 A diploma in Computer Science
 A diploma in Hospitality and Tourism
 A diploma in Business Administration
 A Royal Roads University Bachelor of Commerce transfer program
 An Acadia University Bachelor of Computer Science transfer program
A B.Ed. degree program

Trivia 
Scenes of the Fringe episodes "Jacksonville" and "Subject 13" were shot at the school.

References

External links
 Richmond School District official website
 School homepage on archive.org
 Google Street View of school
 Industry Canada profile

High schools in Richmond, British Columbia
Educational institutions established in 1991
1991 establishments in British Columbia